The following is a timeline of the history of the city of Kingston, Jamaica.

Prior to 19th century
 1692 – 7 June: The Jamaica earthquake destroys Port Royal due to heavy liquefaction and a tsunami; around 5,000 are killed there. Residents resettle nearby thus establishing Kingston.
 1690s – Parish Church built (approximate date).
 1703 - Port Royal laid waste by fire.
 1712 – Hurricane.
 1720 – Pirate Calico Jack hanged.
 1722
 Hurricane.
 Weekly Jamaica Courant newspaper in publication.
 1729 – Wolmers's School founded.
 1740 – "Twelve Apostles" battery constructed.
 1746 – Theatre opens in Harbour Street.
 1750 – Sephardic synagogue built.
 1755
 House of Assembly (legislature of British Jamaica) relocated to Kingston from Spanish Town.
 Population: 10,000 (approximate).
 1771 – 3 September: An earthquake causes moderate damage in Port Royal and Kingston.
 1775 – American Company of Comedians in performance.
 1780 - Fire.
 1783 – Kingston Race Course laid out.
 1788 – Population: 26,478 (of which 16,659 were slaves).
 1794 – Kingston Medical Society founded.

19th century

 1802 – Kingston incorporated.
 1807 – Slave trade officially abolished per Slave Trade Act.
 1823 – Population: 33,000 (approximate).
 1824 – Jamaica Journal and Kingston Chronicle newspaper begins publication.
 1825 – Jamaica Horticultural Society founded.
 1834
 Slavery officially abolished per Slavery Abolition Act.
 Jamaica Gleaner newspaper begins publication.
 Mico College founded.
 1843
 26 August: Fire.
 Agricultural Society founded.
 1845 – Spanish Town-Kingston railway (Jamaica Railway Company) begins operating and Kingston railway station opens.
 1862 - Fire.
 1870 – Legislative Council of British Jamaica moves to Headquarters House.
 1872
 Capital of British Jamaica relocated to Kingston from Spanish Town.
 Victoria Market built on site of "Sunday/Negro market."
 Jamaica Club founded.
 1879 – Institute of Jamaica and Sugar Wharf established.
 1881
 Population: 36,846.
 Devon House (residence) built.
 1882 – 11 December: Fire.
 1885 – Shaare Shalom Synagogue built.
 1887 – Jubilee Market dedicated.
 1890 – Chinese Benevolent Society founded.
 1891
 Constant Spring Hotel in business (approximate date).
 Population: 46,542.
 Jamaica International Exhibition held.
 1892 - Electricity came to Jamaica. 
 1894 – Montego Bay-Kingston railway begins operating.
 1897 – Victoria Park opens (approximate date).
 1898 – Adrian Robinson becomes mayor.
 1899 – Electric tram begins operating.

20th century

1900s–1950s

 1907 – 14 January: The 6.5  Kingston earthquake causes 800–1,000 deaths and flooding from a moderate tsunami.
 1908 – King's House, Jamaica built.
 1910 – Alpha Boys Band active.
 1912
 Ward Theatre established.
 Hubert A. L. Simpson becomes mayor.
 1914 – Population: 57,379.
 1918 – Myrtle Bank Hotel rebuilt.
 1923 – Kingston and St. Andrew Corporation (city government) formed.
 1927
 December: Marcus Garvey returns to Kingston.
 Heritage Dam built.
 1929
 Blackman newspaper begins publication.
 August: Universal Negro Improvement Association Convention held.
 1930 – Sabina Park (cricket ground) established.
 1935 – King of Kings Ethiopian Mission founded (approximate date).
 1938 – Carib Theatre opens.
 1947 – Alexander Bustamante elected mayor.
 1948
 Kingston Air Traffic Control Centre and Palisadoes Airport established.
 University College of the West Indies established near city.
 1951 – August: Hurricane Charlie.
 1956 – Catholic Diocese of Kingston formed.
 1957 – Earthquake.
 1958 – Iris King becomes mayor.

1960s–1990s

 1960
 Parliament of Jamaica moves to Gordon House.
 Population: 123,403 city; 376,520 urban agglomeration.
 1962
 6 August: City becomes part of independent Jamaica.
 Independence Park (sports complex) opens.
 15–28 August: 1962 Central American and Caribbean Games held.
 Tivoli Gardens housing complex in Back O'Wall built.
 1963
 Studio One (record label) in business.
 McIntyre Land Citizens' Association formed.
 1964 – 11 November: Burial of Marcus Garvey in King George VI Memorial Park.
 1965 – Ethnic unrest.
 1966
 21 April: Haile Selassie visits Jamaica.
 August: 1966 British Empire and Commonwealth Games held.
 1968 – Jamaica Stock Exchange founded.
 1970
 Tuff Gong record label founded.
 Population: 111,879 city; 475,548 urban agglomeration.
 1972 – Ralph Eugene Brown PNP general-secretary becomes mayor.
 1973 – Jamaica Pegasus Hotel built.
 1979 – National Library of Jamaica headquartered in city.
 1982 – Population: 104,041 city; 524,638 urban agglomeration.
 1987 – Bob Marley Museum opens.
 1989 – Marie Atkins becomes mayor.
 1990 – African Caribbean Institute of Jamaica / Jamaica Memory Bank headquartered in Kingston.
 1991 – Population: 103,962 city.
 1993 – The Jamaica Observer newspaper begins publication.

21st century

 2001 – Population: 579,137.
 2002 – Emancipation Park opens in Kingston.
 2003
 Passa Passa begins.
 Desmond McKenzie becomes mayor.
 2008 – Monument "In Memory of Children Killed" unveiled.
 2010 – May–June: 2010 Kingston unrest.
 2011 – Population: 937,700.
 2012 – Angela Brown-Burke becomes mayor.

See also
 Kingston history
 List of National Heritage Sites in Kingston
 Trenchtown history

References

Bibliography

Published in the 18th–19th centuries
 
 
 
 

Published in the 20th century
 
 
 
 
 
 
 
 
 
 
 
 
 
 

Published in the 21st century

External links

 Maps of Kingston, Jamaica, 1960s
 Images of Kingston, Jamaica, various dates (via New York Public Library)
 Images of Kingston, Jamaica, various dates (via U.S. Library of Congress)

Kingston, Jamaica
kingston
kingston
Jamaica history-related lists
Years in Jamaica
Kingston, Jamaica